Deutzia monbeigii, the Monbeig's deutzia (Chinese: 维西溲疏), is a species of flowering plant in the family Hydrangeaceae that is native to Southwest China.

This plant, originally from the northwest of Yunnan, China, was introduced by George Forrest in 1920. He initially collected it in November 1917, and then  again in July 1921. 

In cultivation in the UK it has gained the Royal Horticultural Society's Award of Garden Merit. It should be grown in moist but well-drained soil under full sunlight or partial shade. It can be propagated using softwood cuttings during summer.

References

monbeigii
Flora of Yunnan